Jayeebhava is a 2009 Indian Telugu-language action film directed by Naren Kondepati. It stars Kalyan Ram & Hansika Motwani in the lead roles. Music was composed by S. S. Thaman. The film was a failure at the box office. This film was dubbed into Hindi as Badmash No. 1.

Plot

Bhavani Shankar (Mukesh Rishi) and Narasimha (Jaya Prakash Reddy) are two warring leaders in that town. Ram (Nandamuri Kalyan Ram) is the son of Bhavani Shankar. He falls in love with Anjali (Hansika Motwani) when he is abroad. After coming back to the town, they realize they belong to two warring groups. The rest of the story is about how Ram and Anjali play a game to unite their fathers.

Cast
 Kalyan Ram as Ram
 Hansika Motwani as Anjali
 Mukesh Rishi as Bhavani Shankar, Ram's father
 Venu Madhav as Ram's Friend
 Jaya Prakash Reddy as Narasimha, Anjali's father
 Ashish Vidyarthi as Yaadu Bhai
 Ali as Balu 
 Brahmanandam as Priest
 Chalapathi Rao as Ram's grandfather
 Raghu Babu as "Tiger" Paandu
 Banerjee as Banerjee

Soundtrack
The music was composed by S. Thaman and released by Aditya Music.

References

External links
 
 Jayeebhava at oneindia.in

2009 films
Indian action films
Films scored by Thaman S
2000s Telugu-language films
2009 action films